The Jatco JF506E/F5A5 transmission is an electronic/hydraulic five-speed automatic transmission for passenger cars and deployed in a variety of cars from Jaguar, Rover, Land Rover, Ford, Mazda, Mitsubishi, Volkswagen and Seat. This gearbox is known as 09A / 09B on Volkswagen vehicles.

Gear ratios

Applications
2002-2003 Mitsubishi Lancer Evolution VII GT-A
2005-2007 Mitsubishi Lancer Evolution IX Wagon GT-A
Volkswagen Golf Mk4, succeeded by the Direct-Shift Gearbox (DSG) based dual clutch transmission on the Golf R32
Volkswagen Jetta/Bora Mk4, with 1.8T, VR5, VR6 and TDI Pump-Duse engines. Final drive ratios: 4.17(gasoline) and 3.48 (TDI)
Volkswagen Sharan Mk I
Land Rover Freelander Mk I
2001-2009 Jaguar X-Type
2000-2006 Ford Mondeo Mk III
Ford Galaxy Mk I & Mk II
1999-2006 Mazda MPV
1996-2003 Audi A3 Mk I
1999-2005 Rover 75

See also
List of Jatco transmissions

JF506E